Didier Janvier Ovono Ebang (born 23 January 1983) is Gabonese professional footballer who plays as a goalkeeper.

Club career
In 2008, Ovono won the Georgian League with FC Dinamo Tbilisi. On 22 June 2009, he moved from Dinamo Tbilisi to Le Mans Union Club 72 in Ligue 1 where he was given a three-year contract until June 2012.

In February 2021 Ovono joined Championnat National 2 club FCSR Haguenau.

International career
Ovono played at the 2010 African Cup of Nations for the Gabon national team, including a good performance and a clean sheet in Gabon's surprise opening victory over Cameroon.

In 2012, he played in all four national team matches at the 2012 Africa Cup of Nations, two of which were clean sheets. As a result,  Gabon reached the quarterfinals.

He retired from the national team in May 2017. Later on, he came out of retirement to be the first Gabonese player to have 100 or more international appearances.

Career statistics

International

See also
 List of footballers with 100 or more caps

References

External links
 
 

1983 births
Living people
People from Ogooué-Maritime Province
Gabonese footballers
Association football goalkeepers
Gabon international footballers
Olympic footballers of Gabon
Footballers at the 2012 Summer Olympics
2010 Africa Cup of Nations players
2012 Africa Cup of Nations players
2015 Africa Cup of Nations players
2017 Africa Cup of Nations players
FIFA Century Club
Ligue 1 players
Ligue 2 players
Belgian Pro League players
AS Mangasport players
FC Dinamo Tbilisi players
Le Mans FC players
Alianza F.C. footballers
K.V. Oostende players
FC Sochaux-Montbéliard players
Paris FC players
FCSR Haguenau players
French sportspeople of Gabonese descent
Gabonese expatriate footballers
Expatriate footballers in Belgium
Expatriate footballers in France
Expatriate footballers in El Salvador
Expatriate footballers in Portugal
Expatriate footballers in Georgia (country)
Gabonese expatriate sportspeople in Belgium
Gabonese expatriate sportspeople in France
Gabonese expatriate sportspeople in Portugal
Gabonese expatriate sportspeople in Georgia (country)